Sri Lanka Campaign for Peace and Justice is an international, non profit, human rights group founded in 2009 to seek justice for thousands of Tamils killed during the final stages of the Sri Lankan Civil War and promote lasting peace. Charu Lata Hogg is the chair of the group and advisory council members include Lakhdar Brahimi.

Objectives 
The objectives of the Sri Lanka Campaign are to:

1. Achieve genuine reconciliation based on accountability for violations of international law

2. Build respect for human rights and the rule of law

3. Support efforts within Sri Lankan civil society to promote a just and lasting peace

References

External links 
Official Website

Human rights organisations based in the United Kingdom
Imprisonment and detention
Organizations established in 2009
Human rights in Sri Lanka